The Episcopal Church in Delaware, formerly known as the Episcopal Diocese of Delaware, is one of 108 dioceses making up the Episcopal Church in the United States of America. It consists of 33 congregations or parishes in an area the same as the State of Delaware. The diocese is led by a bishop and staff and provides episcopal supervision and some administrative assistance for its parishes.

The current bishop, the eleventh Bishop of Delaware, is Kevin Scott Brown, who was consecrated bishop December 9, 2017, and succeeded Wayne P. Wright upon the latter's retirement. The diocesan offices were located for many years at the campus of the Cathedral Church of Saint John, in Wilmington, Delaware. When the cathedral closed in 2012, the offices moved, in 2014, to 913 Wilson Road, Wilmington, DE the site of the former Saint Alban's Church.

History
The Episcopal Church in Delaware, formerly known as the Episcopal Diocese of Delaware, dates its foundation to 1785, the first time a delegation was sent representing the diocese to the General Convention. Charles Wharton presided over the first state convention on September 26, 1786, at which it was decided to form a wholly separate diocese from that of the Episcopal Diocese of Pennsylvania or the Episcopal Diocese of Maryland, but under the episcopal supervision of the Bishop of Pennsylvania. It is one of the nine original Dioceses of the Episcopal Church in the United States of America.

List of bishops

Congregations
This list includes all the active congregations in the Episcopal Diocese of Delaware and the historical parishes will gradually be added.

Kent County

New Castle County

Sussex County

References
 The Episcopal Church Diocese of Delaware (2005) [Annual Report]
 
 

Specific

External links
St. Mark's Episcopal Church, Millsboro, Delaware
St. Anne's Episcopal Church, Middletown, Delaware
The Episcopal Church of St. John the Baptist, Milton, Delaware
Journal of the Annual Convention, Diocese of Delaware
Records and photograph collections for Christ Church, Christiana Hundred in Greenville, Delaware are available for research at Hagley Museum and Library. 

Diocese of Delaware
Delaware
Delaware
Province 3 of the Episcopal Church (United States)
Religious organizations established in 1785